Clanculus ormophorus is a species of medium-sized sea snail, a marine gastropod mollusc in the family Trochidae, the top snails.

This name applies to a species which is incertae sedis; the name may be a synonym of another species.

Description
The size of the shell attains 18 mm. The umbilical shell has a depressed-conical shape with rounded whorls. The cinguli are granulated in an equal manner. The first, second and third cinguli  contain cinguli with dark granules alternated with white. The fourth contains brown granules. The penultimate whorl is crooked. The body whorl is rounded. The umbilicus is crenulated. The columella is callous, subreflexed and with a triplicate tooth at its base.

Distribution
This marine species occurs in the Persian Gulf.

References

 OBIS info
 Adams, A., 1853. Contributions towards a monograph of the Trochidae, a family of gastropodous Mollusca. . Proc. Zool. Soc. Lond., 1851(19):150-192

External links
 

ormophorus
Gastropods described in 1853